The High Commissioner of the United Kingdom to Kenya is the United Kingdom's foremost diplomatic representative in the Republic of Kenya, and in charge of the UK's diplomatic mission in Kenya.

As fellow members of the Commonwealth of Nations, the United Kingdom and Kenya conduct their diplomatic relations at governmental level, rather than between Heads of State.  Therefore, the countries exchange High Commissioners rather than ambassadors.

High Commissioners to Kenya

1963–1964: Sir Geoffrey de Freitas
1964–1965: Malcolm MacDonald
1966–1968: Sir Edward Peck
1968–1972: Sir Eric Norris
1972–1975: Sir Antony Duff
1975–1979: Sir Stanley Fingland
1979–1982: Sir John Williams
1982–1986: Sir Leonard Allinson
1986–1990: Sir John Johnson
1990–1992: Sir Roger Tomkys
1992–1995: Sir Kieran Prendergast
1995–1997: Simon Hemans
1997–2001: Sir Jeffrey James
2001–2005: Sir Edward Clay
2005–2008: Adam Wood
2008–2011: Robert Macaire
2011–2012: Peter Tibber
2012–2015: Christian Turner
2015–2019: Nic Hailey

2019–: Jane Marriott

External links

UK and Kenya, gov.uk

References

Kenya
 
United Kingdom
Kenya and the Commonwealth of Nations
United Kingdom and the Commonwealth of Nations